Aneesa Sharif Saddique (born 10 July 1991), also known as Aneesa Sharif, is a British Pakistani model living in UK. Aneesa founded Lamour Clinic and Aesthetic Practice that offers advanced therapies and Facial Harmonisation treatment. She has worked with L'Oréal Pakistan and other brands and has been awarded ‘Best Female Model of 2016 and 2019.

Career 
Aneesa was born and raised in the United Kingdom. She started her career in 2014 as a make-up artist. She went to Amersham & Wycombe College, and The University of Westminster for further education. Aneesa modeled for SmashBoxuk, Krylon, and Charlotte Tilbury, and Mac for their Asian Bridal representation. She appeared in Bridal Couture Week, Fashion Pakistan, and PFDC. In 2022, Aneesa opened the show in Switzerland for the Riwayat lifestyle London show.

References 

Living people
1991 births
British models of Pakistani descent
Alumni of the University of Westminster
People from High Wycombe